AP-1 complex subunit gamma-1 is a protein that in humans is encoded by the AP1G1 gene.

Function 

Adaptins are important components of clathrin-coated vesicles transporting ligand-receptor complexes from the plasma membrane or from the trans-Golgi network to lysosomes. The adaptin family of proteins is composed of four classes of molecules named alpha, beta-, beta prime- and gamma- adaptins. Adaptins, together with medium and small subunits, form a heterotetrameric complex called an adaptor, whose role is to promote the formation of clathrin-coated pits and vesicles. The protein encoded by this gene is a gamma-adaptin protein and it belongs to the adaptor complexes large subunits family. Two transcript variants encoding different isoforms have been found for this gene.

Interactions 

AP1G1 has been shown to interact with:

 AP1B1, 
 AP1GBP1,
 AP1M1, 
 AP1S1, 
 NECAP2, 
 RABEP1,  and
 Synaptophysin.

References

Further reading

External links
 

Proteins